Santa Fe is a 1951 American Western film directed by Irving Pichel and starring Randolph Scott. The film is based on the novel Santa Fe by James Vance Marshall.

Plot
In the years following the Civil War, Britt Canfield, one of four ex-Confederate brothers, heads west for a new life. Britt accepts a job with the Santa Fe Railway, whilst his three brothers find themselves on the wrong side of the law. Britt is eventually obliged to bring his brothers to justice, but the real man behind their criminal activities is gambling boss Cole Sanders.

Cast
 Randolph Scott as Brit Canfield
 Janis Carter as Judith Chandler
 Jerome Courtland as Terry Canfield 
 Peter M. Thompson as Tom Canfield 
 John Archer as Clint Canfield
 Warner Anderson as Dave Baxter
 Roy Roberts as Cole Sanders
 Billy House as Luke Plummer
 Olin Howland as Dan Dugan  
 Allene Roberts as Ella Sue Canfield

Director Pichel, himself an actor, also narrates the film.

See also
 List of American films of 1951
 Santa Fe, New Mexico

References

External links
 
 
 
 
 

1951 films
Columbia Pictures films
American historical films
1950s historical films
1951 Western (genre) films
Films directed by Irving Pichel
American Western (genre) films
Cultural depictions of Bat Masterson
Films scored by Paul Sawtell
Films based on British novels
1950s English-language films
1950s American films